The discography of the American rock band Everclear consists of nine studio albums, six compilation albums, five extended plays, and 24 singles. Their first studio album, World of Noise, was released in 1993 and did not chart. Their second, 1995's Sparkle and Fade, peaked at number 25 in the United States and went platinum in both the US and Canada. Four singles were released from the album, including "Santa Monica", which reached number one on the Hot Mainstream Rock Tracks chart.

So Much for the Afterglow was released in 1997 and became Everclear's best-selling album, going two times platinum in the US and Canada. The singles "Everything to Everyone" and "I Will Buy You a New Life" both peaked in the top three of the alternative rock charts in the US and Canada, as well.

In 2000, the band released two albums: Songs from an American Movie Vol. One: Learning How to Smile and Songs from an American Movie Vol. Two: Good Time for a Bad Attitude. The former peaked in the top 10 in the US and Canada, and one of the singles from the album, "Wonderful", reached the top three of both the US and Canada alternative rock charts.

Everclear's next studio album, Slow Motion Daydream, was released in 2003. A single from that album, "Volvo Driving Soccer Mom" was their last single that charted until "The Man Who Broke His Own Heart" in 2015. The band's first compilation album, Ten Years Gone: The Best of Everclear 1994–2004, was released in 2004.

In 2006, they released their seventh studio album, Welcome to the Drama Club, and their second compilation album, The Best of Everclear. Welcome to the Drama Club was their first studio album since World of Noise that did not reach the top 100 of the Billboard 200. Over the following six years, they released another studio album, Invisible Stars, and four compilation albums. Recently, it was announced that they were recording a new album at ThinkLoud Studios, by the name of Black Is the New Black, to be released in 2015.

Albums

Studio albums

Compilation albums

EPs

Singles

Notes

A  "Santa Monica" did not enter the Billboard Hot 100, but peaked at number 29 on the Hot 100 Airplay chart.
B  "Everything to Everyone" did not enter the Billboard Hot 100, but peaked at number 43 on the Hot 100 Airplay chart.
C  "I Will Buy You a New Life" did not enter the Billboard Hot 100, but peaked at number 33 on the Hot 100 Airplay chart.
D  "Father of Mine" originally did not enter the Billboard Hot 100, but peaked at number 46 on the Hot 100 Airplay chart, but the song later charted on the Billboard Hot 100 since the rules have changed after December 1998 bringing the song up to number 70 on that chart.
E  "AM Radio" did not enter the Billboard Hot 100, but peaked at number 1 on the Bubbling Under Hot 100 Singles chart, which acts as a 25-song extension to the Hot 100.
F  "When It All Goes Wrong Again" did not enter the Billboard Hot 100, but peaked at number 21 on the Bubbling Under Hot 100 Singles chart, which acts as a 25-song extension to the Hot 100.

References

Discographies of American artists
Discography
Rock music group discographies